Charles Blake may refer to:

 Charles Blake (divine) (1664–1730), English divine and poet
 Charles Blake (surgeon) (1746–1810), British army surgeon
 Charles Henry Blake (1794–1872), British businessman in India, later a property developer and railway company director
 Charles Blake (chess player) (1880–1961), U.S. Open Chess Champion in 1911
 Charles Edward Blake Sr. (born 1940), American bishop of the Church of God in Christ
 Charles Blake (politician) (born 1983), African-American Democratic member of the Arkansas House of Representatives